Tumor promotion is a process in carcinogenesis by which various factors permit the descendants of a single initiated cell to survive and expand in number, i.e. to resist apoptosis and to undergo clonal growth.  This is a step toward tumor progression.

In order for a tumor cell to survive, it must decrease its expression of tumor suppressor genes such as p53, BRCA1, BRCA2, RB1, or the fas receptor. A tumor suppressor would trigger an apoptotic pathway in a cancer cell if there were DNA damage, polyploidy, or uncontrolled cell growth.

Simultaneously, tumor cells need to upregulate oncogenes, which promote or cause downstream activation of growth factors and cell survival signals such as RAS, Mitogen-activated protein kinase kinase, VEGF, or Akt.

See also 
 Phorbol myristate acetate
 Tumor initiation
 Tumor progression

References 

Carcinogenesis